Arnau de Llordà  was a Bishop of Urgell who served as Episcopal Co-Prince of Andorra from 1326 to 1341. He served alongside French Co-Prince Gaston II of Foix - Bearne.

References

14th-century Princes of Andorra
Bishops of Urgell
Year of birth missing
Year of death missing
14th-century Roman Catholic bishops in Castile